Runhild Gammelsæter is a Norwegian musician notable for being the vocalist for the American bands Thorr's Hammer and Khlyst.  She works as a professional biologist and holds a Ph.D. in cell physiology.

Biography
Runhild Gammelsæter was a 17-year-old foreign exchange student from Norway when she joined Thorr's Hammer along with Stephen O'Malley and Greg Anderson. After six weeks, which was the time it took to release Sannhet i Blodet and record Dommedagsnatt, the band split up due to Runhild returning to Oslo, Norway. Dommedagsnatt was released soon afterwards in 1996 via Southern Lord Records. The four other members of Thorr's Hammer went on to form the band Burning Witch.

In 2006, she helped form the band Khlyst along with James Plotkin and Tim Wyskida. The album Chaos is My Name was released the same year, which also featured two painted portraits by Runhild herself.

On June 28, 2008, her debut solo album, Amplicon, was released through Utech Records.

On December 13, 2014, she released a collaboration album with a renowned Norwegian noise musician Lasse Marhaug, Quantum Entanglement.

Runhild Gammelsæter has a PhD in cell physiology from the Faculty of Medicine of the University of Oslo.  She is also a Fulbright Scholar, and is currently serving on the Board of Directors of Norwegian biotechnology company Regenics A.S.

Discography

With Thorr's Hammer
Sannhet i Blodet (demo, 1995)
Dommedagsnatt (EP, 1996)

With Khlyst
Chaos is My Name (full-length, 2006)
Chaos Live (DVD, 2008)

Solo
Amplicon (full-length, 2008)

With Lasse Marhaug
 Quantum Entanglement (full-length, 2014)
 Higgs Boson (full-length, 2022)

As a guest or session musician
White1 - Sunn O))) (full-length, 2003) lyrics and vocals for the song "The Gates of Ballard"
Ingentes Atque Decorii Vexilliferi Apokalypsis - Fleurety (7-inch EP, 2009) vocals on the song "Descent Into Darkness"

References

External links
Amplicon/Runhild Gammelsaeter official website

Runhild Gammelsaeter on Last.fm

1977 births
Living people
Women heavy metal singers
Norwegian expatriates in the United States
Norwegian heavy metal musicians
Norwegian physiologists
University of Oslo alumni
Women biologists
People from Holmestrand
Thorr's Hammer members
Khlyst (band) members
21st-century Norwegian singers
21st-century Norwegian women singers